Upendranath Bhattacharya is an Indian Bengali writer.

His books 
This list is incomplete:

 Rabindra Kabya Parikrama
Rabindra Natya Parikrama
Banger Beer Santan
Prithibir Ashcharjya
Bangla Sahityer Sankshipta Itibritta
Banglar Baul O Baul Gaan
Banglar Baul Gaan

Awards 
He won Rabindra Puraskar for his musicology 'Banglar Baul Gaan' in 1959

References

External links 

http://libnet.vidyasagar.ac.in/cgi-bin/koha/opac-detail.pl?biblionumber=26174
https://bn.m.wikisource.org/wiki/%E0%A6%9A%E0%A6%BF%E0%A6%A4%E0%A7%8D%E0%A6%B0:4990010055253_-_Banglar_Baul_O_Baul_Gan,_Bhattacharya,_Upendranath,_1182p,_LANGUAGE._LINGUISTICS._LITERATURE,_bengali_(1951).pdf

Indian writers
Bengali writers
Recipients of the Rabindra Puraskar
Writers from West Bengal